Anatolie Popușoi (born 3 April 1949) is a Moldovan politician. He is a former member of the Moldovan Parliament, as well as leader of the Agrarian Party of Moldova.

References 

Recipients of the Order of the Republic (Moldova)
1949 births
Politics of Moldova
Living people